Jeff Allan sometimes spelled Jeff Allen (born May 17, 1957) is a Canadian former professional ice hockey defenceman who played four games in the National Hockey League for the Cleveland Barons. He would also play two games in the World Hockey Association with the Cincinnati Stingers. As a youth, he played in the 1970 Quebec International Pee-Wee Hockey Tournament with the Toronto Young Nationals minor ice hockey team.

Career statistics

References

External links

1957 births
Living people
Canadian ice hockey defencemen
Cleveland Barons (NHL) draft picks
Cleveland Barons (NHL) players
Cincinnati Stingers draft picks
Cincinnati Stingers players
Cornwall Royals (QMJHL) players
Hampton Gulls (AHL) players
Hull Olympiques players
Peterborough Petes (ice hockey) players
Ice hockey people from Toronto